Flemming Topsøe (born 25 August 1938 in Aarhus, Denmark) is a Danish mathematician, and is emeritus in the mathematics department of the University of Copenhagen.  He is the author of several mathematical science works, among them works about analysis, probability theory and information theory. He is the older brother of the engineer Henrik Topsøe (born 1944), son of the engineer Haldor Topsøe (1913–2013) and great-grandson of the crystallographer and chemist Haldor Topsøe (1842–1935).

Topsøe completed his magister degree in mathematics at Aarhus University in 1962. After spending a year at the University of Cambridge in 1965–1966, he finished his PhD in 1971 at the University of Copenhagen.  His thesis was titled Topology and Measure, and was later published by Springer.  He was leader of the Danish Mathematical Society 1978–1982 and dynamic leader of Euromath 1983–1998, a great project about expansion of Internet-based services to mathematics societies in Europe and Russia. He received a Hlavka memorial medal in 1992 and a B. Bolzano honorary medal in 2006 of the Czechoslovak Academy of Sciences for his mathematical contributions.

Books

References

External links

1938 births
Living people
People from Aarhus
Academic staff of the University of Copenhagen
Danish mathematicians
Danish science writers